Fremont County may refer to:

Fremont County, Colorado 
Fremont County, Idaho 
Fremont County, Iowa 
Fremont County, Wyoming
Fremont County, Kansas Territory